Michael Bambang Hartono (born 2 October 1939) is an Indonesian billionaire heir and businessman.

Michael and his brother Robert Budi are the owners of kretek (clove cigarette) manufacturer Djarum, which they inherited from their father Oei Wie Gwan upon his death in 1963. Growing the business to a large conglomerate including Bank Central Asia, electronics, plantations and various properties, they became the richest in the country with Michael himself having a net worth in excess of $10 billion.

Early life
Michael Hartono was born on 2 October 1939, in the town of Kudus, in Central Java. His father, Oei Wie Gwan, had purchased a small Kretek cigarette factory called Djarum Gramophon (lit: Gramophone needle) in April 1951, and renamed it to just Djarum. In 1963, however, the factory burned down and shortly thereafter Oie Wie died, leaving Michael and his younger brother Robert Budi Hartono to inherit the factory.

After completing his highschool in Kudus, Michael studied in the faculty of economics and business at Diponegoro University starting 1959, but returned to Kudus upon his father's death.

Career
The cigarette company grew under the two brothers, making its first export in 1972 and introducing new products. Today, the cigarette brand is one of the largest in Indonesia, with a 19 percent market share in 2012. As the cigarette business continued to grow, the group began expanding to other fields, founding an electronics brand Polytron in 1975. The group also expanded into businesses like palm oil, papermaking and communication towers.

Starting their entry into the banking business through Haga Bank and Hagakita Bank, the brothers under the Mauritius-registered corporation FarIndo Investments in a consortium with Farallon Capital took over 51.15% of Bank Central Asia in 2002, defeating other bidders despite making a lower offer. While initially only holding less than 10% stake in the consortium, Djarum held a 92.18% stake in the consortium by 2006, though the Haga and Hagakita Banks were sold to Rabobank. After a Rp 3.45 trillion deal with UBS in 2010, the brothers controlled a majority of the company's shares.

The shares were transferred to an Indonesian holding company PT Dwimuria Investama Andalan in 2016 during a tax amnesty program. As of September 2017, the company was jointly held by Michael and Robert, and possessed a 54.94% stake in BCA.

Aside from the aforementioned businesses, the Djarum group also controls several shopping malls and buildings in Jakarta, including Grand Indonesia, Hotel Indonesia and BCA Tower.

According to Forbes, Hartono has a net worth of $18.5 billion, as of September 2019, making him the 56th richest person in the world. He and his brother – who was also listed slightly under him at 69th – were named as the richest Indonesians in 2017, the 9th year in a row they were listed as such.

His company is also active in internet ventures, controlling e-commerce website Blibli.com and one of Indonesia's largest online communities Kaskus.

Personal life
He lives in Kudus, Indonesia and is married to Widowati Hartono. The couple have four children.;

Bridge
Bambang is a bridge player. In an interview, he said that "bridge is how you train yourself in making good decisions and risk-taking" and that his uncle introduced him to the game during the Japanese occupation of Indonesia. A major supporter of the sport in the country and president of the South East Asia Bridge Federation, he received an award from the World Bridge Federation in 2017 for his support in making bridge a category in the Asian Games.

He represented Indonesia at the Asian Games 2018 in bridge, winning a bronze medal with his team at the Supermixed team event hence making him the oldest Indonesian Asian Games medal winner. He was the oldest athlete in the Indonesian contingent, though several other non-Indonesian bridge players were older. He had also participated in other competitions abroad, in one case self-admittedly falling asleep during a finals match due to drinking wine beforehand.

He was part of the Indonesian teams which won bronze medals in the 2008 World Bridge Games in Beijing, the 2009 World Team Championships in Sao Paulo, and the 2010 World Series Championships in Philadelphia.

References

Further reading

External links
 

1941 births
Living people
Indonesian billionaires
Diponegoro University alumni
Indonesian businesspeople
Indonesian people of Chinese descent
Indonesian contract bridge players
Michael
Bridge players at the 2018 Asian Games
Asian Games bronze medalists for Indonesia
Asian Games medalists in bridge
Medalists at the 2018 Asian Games
People from Kudus Regency
Sportspeople from Central Java